The 22nd Mechanised Brigade was a formation of the Ukrainian Ground Forces from 2000 to 2003. However most of its historical traditions stem from the 66th Guards Rifle Division, originally a formation of the Red Army and later of the Soviet Ground Forces.

After 26 October 1999, full name of the Division became 66th Guards Mechanized Bukovina, Poltava Red Banner Division of the 38th Army Corps of the Western Operational Command of the Armed Forces of Ukraine

History
By Order of the People's Commissariat of Defence of the USSR № 034 from January 21, 1943, the 293rd Rifle Division was reorganized into the 66th Guards Rifle Division. Major General Akim Yakshin became Division's new commander after Pavel Lagutin was promoted to Executive officer of the 21st Army. On February 7, 1943, most of the Divisions units were renamed.

On March 17, 1943, the 66th was assigned to 6th Guards Rifle Corps, 1st Guards Army, Southwestern Front, from May 5, 1943, the 66th was assigned to 5th Guards Army Steppe Military District. From May 9, 1943, the 66th was with 32nd Guards Rifle Corps 5th Guards Army. During Battle of Kursk and Lower Dnepr strategic offensive operation the 66th was with 33rd Guards Rifle Corps 5th Guards Army, later she was again assigned to 32nd Guards Corps. On September 23, 1943, the 66th was awarded with the honorable name "Poltava" by Supreme Commander. By the end of October the 66th was with 53rd Army, 2nd Ukrainian Front.
On November 28, 1943, Major General Sergey Frolov became new Divisions commander, he would remain there until the end of the war. On November 30, 1943, the 66th was with 20th Guards Rifle Corps 4th Guards Army. On January 3, 1944 66th was assigned to 48th Rifle Corps 53rd Army. While taking part in Korsun-Shevchenkovsky Offensive Operation, 66th was with 75th Rifle Corps, later she was assigned to 26th Guards Rifle Corps.

On March 1, 1943, 66th was with 69th Army reserve of Stavka near Shpola Cherkasy Oblast. On April 11, 1944 Division was relocated by rail to Zaporizhia with 1st Ukrainian Front.
During Lvov-Sandomierz Offensive 66th was with 95th Rifle Corps 18th Army 1st Ukrainian Front. During the East Carpathian Strategic Offensive Operation (the Dnieper–Carpathian Offensive?) the division was assigned to 18th Guards Rifle Corps 18th Army 4th Ukrainian Front. From September 16, 1944, Division also took part in Carpathian-Uzhgorod Offensive.

On November 14, 1944, 66th with 18th Guards Rifle Corps was assigned to 2nd Ukrainian Front where she took part in Battle of Budapest. On January 23, 1943 66th was with 104th Rifle Corps 4th Guards Army 3rd Ukrainian Front and took part in Balaton Defensive Operation. On April 5, 1945, the Division was awarded Order of the Red Banner by Supreme Soviet of the USSR. From April 15, 1945 66th was with 21st Guards Rifle Corps 4th Guards Army and took part in Vienna Offensive. Division finished combat operations in Austria on May 8, 1945

1945–1992
After Victory Day 66th with 27th Army from June 3 to August 23, 1945, was relocating to Ukraine into Carpathian Military District. First base was in Haisyn Vinnytsia Oblast. From October 1946 Division was assigned to 38th Army in Chernivtsi. Division took part in Hungarian Revolution of 1956. On June 15, 1957 66th Guards Rifle Division became 66th Guards Motor Rifle Division.

On September 15, 1960, 66th became 66th Guards Training Motor Rifle Division. In 1987, 66th Guards Training Motor Rifle Division became 110th Guards Separate Training Center for junior specialists of motor rifle troops of the Carpathian Military District.

Under Ukrainian control

The Training Center became under Ukrainian control after Ukraine declared independence from the Soviet Union. On January 19, 1992, the Training Center along with all other units stationed in Ukraine, pledged their allegiance to Ukrainian people. In May 1992, the 110th Guards Districts Training Center was disbanded by the directive of the Ministry of Defense. On September 1, 1992, a new 66th Mechanized Division started forming on the basis of units from the disbanded Training Center.

A few units from the 17th Guards Motor Rifle Division were added to the Division, when the 17th was reduced to a Brigade. Division was a part of the 38th Army Corps (former 38th Army) Western Operational Command. On October 26, 1999, President of Ukraine Leonid Kuchma awarded the Division with Bukovina title. On October 30, 2000, all of the honorifics which the Division earned throughout her history were restored. Name of the Division became 66th Guards Bukovina, Poltava Red Banner Mechanized Division. Soon after, the Division was reformed into the 22nd Mechanized Brigade, all of the Divisions regalia was lost. During 2003 only 300th Mechanized Regiment remained, the rest of the units of the Brigade were disbanded.

Order of battle

293rd Rifle Division (July 7, 1941)
1032nd Rifle Regiment
1034th Rifle Regiment
1036th Rifle Regiment
817th Artillery Regiment
576th Separate Anti-Aircraft Artillery Battalion
350th Separate Reconnaissance Battalion
586th Engineer Battalion
571st Separate Signal Battalion
721st Transport Company
319th Medical Battalion
384th Separate Chemical Company
377th Field Bakery
645th Divisions Veterinary Hospital
973rd Field Post Office
859th ПКГБ

293rd Rifle Division (October 12, 1942)
1032nd Rifle Regiment
1034th Rifle Regiment
1036th Rifle Regiment
817th Artillery Regiment
331st Anti-Tank Battalion
586th Separate Engineer Battalion
414th Separate Anti-Aircraft Battery
350th Separate Reconnaissance Company
243rd Separate Supply Company
384th Separate Chemical Company
319th Separate Medical Battalion
420th Transport Company
27th Field Bakery
645th Divisions Veterinary Hospital
973rd Field Post Office
859th ПКГБ
Training Rifle Battalion

66th Guards Rifle Division (February 7, 1943 – June 15, 1957)
145th Guards Rifle Regiment
193rd Guards Rifle Regiment
195th Guards Rifle Regiment
135th Guards Artillery Regiment
71st Guards Anti-Tank Battalion
74th Separate Guards Engineer Battalion
81st Guards Separate Anti-Aircraft Battery
67th Separate Guards Reconnaissance Company
94th Separate Guards Supply Company
68th Separate Guards Chemical Company
72nd Separate Medical Battalion
70th Transport Company
64th Field Bakery
65th Divisions Veterinary Hospital
973rd Field Post Office
859th ПКГБ
Training Rifle Battalion

66th Guards Motor Rifle Division (June 15, 1957 – September 15, 1960)
145th Guards Motor Rifle Regiment
193rd Guards Motor Rifle Regiment
195th Guards Motor Rifle Regiment
128th Guards Tank Regiment
358th Separate Signal Battalion
278th Separate Chemical Platoon
495th Separate Anti-Aircraft Artillery Battalion
101st Separate Reconnaissance Company
358th Separate Guards Signal Company
74th Separate Guards Engineer Battalion

66th Guards Training Motor Rifle Division (September 15, 1960 – 1987)
145th Guards Training Motor Rifle Regiment
193rd Guards Training Motor Rifle Regiment – 193rd Motor Rifle Regiment (1961)
195th Guards Training Motor Rifle Regiment
128th Guards Training Tank Regiment
135th Guards Training Artillery Regimen
495th Separate Guards Anti-Aircraft Artillery Battalion
74th Separate Guards Training Engineer Battalion
179th Separate Guards Training Signal Battalion
81st Separate Training Chemical Battalion – 56th Separate Chemical Company – 524th Separate Training Chemical Battalion (1961) – 247th Separate Chemical Company (1985)
79th Separate Training Medical Battalion
363rd Separate Transport Company
650th Armored Maintenance Depot (until March 1, 1964)
792nd Auto Maintenance Depot (until March 1, 1964)
847th Separate Rocket Battalion (May 1, 1962)
435th Separate Maintenance Battalion (March 1, 1964) – 435th Separate Training Maintenance Battalion (December 1, 1972)
1262nd Separate Training Repair Battalion (1985)

110th Guards Separate Training Center (1987–1992)
145th Guards Training Budapest Motor Rifle Regiment (Chernivtsi)
193rd Guards Training Motor Rifle Regiment (Chernivtsi)
195th Guards Training Motor Rifle Regiment (Chernivtsi)
128th Guards Training Tank Regiment (Storozhynets)
135th Guards Training Artillery Regiment (Chernivtsi)
1292nd Training Anti-Aircraft Artillery Regiment (Chernivtsi)
847th Separate Rocket Battalion (Chernivtsi)
1262nd Separate Training Reconnaissance Battalion (Chernivtsi)
179th Separate Guards Signal Battalion (Chernivtsi)
74th Separate Training Engineer Battalion (Chernivtsi)
79th Separate Medical Battalion
780th Separate Supply Battalion
435th Separate Training Maintenance Battalion

66th Mechanized Division (1992–2000)
Headquarters (Chernivtsi)
 200th Mechanized Regiment (Chernivtsi)
 300th Mechanized Regiment (Chernivtsi)
 301st Mechanized Regiment (Chernivtsi)
 201st Armored Regiment (Storozhynets)
 50th Separate Engineer Battalion (village Ruda, Khmelnytskyi Oblast)
 28th Separate Signal Battalion (Chernivtsi)
 70th Separate Maintenance Battalion (Storozhynets)
 180th Separate Combat Service Support Battalion (Chernivtsi)
 50th Separate Medical Battalion (Chernivtsi)
 26th Separate Reconnaissance Battalion (Chernivtsi)
 15th Separate Chemical Battalion (Chernivtsi)
 245th Separate Anti-Tank Battalion (Chernivtsi)
 93rd Artillery Regiment
 300th Anti-Aircraft Regiment
 40th Separate Electronic Warfare Company
 2238th Field Post Office
Training Range

22nd Mechanized Brigade (2000–2003)
 300th Mechanized Regiment (Chernivtsi)
 201st Armored Regiment (Storozhynets)
 2206th Separate Brigade Artillery Group (Chernivtsi)
 26th Separate Reconnaissance Battalion (Chernivtsi)
 28th Separate Signal Battalion (Chernivtsi)
 50th Separate Engineer Battalion (village Ruda, Khmelnytskyi Oblast)
 180th Separate Combat Service Support Battalion (Chernivtsi)
 70th Separate Maintenance Battalion (Storozhynets)

Former Commanders
Major General Pavel Lagutin – December 27, 1941 – January 21, 1943
Major General Akim Yakshin – January 21, 1943 – November 15, 1943
Major General Sergey Frolov – November 28, 1943 –

Honors

Unit decorations

Honorable Titles

References

Bibliography

Mechanised infantry brigades of Ukraine
Military units and formations established in 2000
Military units and formations disestablished in 2003
Hungarian Revolution of 1956